Lejzor Szmuel Czyż (March 12, 1917 – October 16, 1969), best known as Leonard Sam Chess, was a Polish-American record company executive and the co-founder of Chess Records. He was influential in the development of electric blues, Chicago blues, and rock and roll.

Early life 
Chess was born to Polish-Jewish parents in Motal, now in Belarus.  He and his brother, Fiszel, sister, Malka, and mother arrived in New York in 1928 from Poland. They quickly went to Chicago to join their father, Joseph,  who was already engaged in the liquor business, which was illegal at the height of Prohibition and controlled in Chicago by Al Capone. The family name was changed to Chess, with Lejzor becoming Leonard and Fiszel becoming Philip.

Chess Records 
Leonard and his brother Phil became involved in the black nightclub scene on the South Side of Chicago in 1938 running a series of jazz clubs, culminating in the Macomba Lounge. In 1947, Leonard became associated with Aristocrat Records, increasing his share in the company over time; eventually he and Phil would acquire complete control. The Chess brothers moved the company away from black pop and jazz and other genres into down home blues music with artists such as Muddy Waters. In 1950, the Chess brothers renamed the company  Chess Records. "My Foolish Heart" (Gene Ammons), "Rollin' Stone" (Muddy Waters), and "That's All Right" (Jimmy Rogers) were among the first releases on the new label. Leonard Chess played bass drum on one of Muddy Waters' sessions in 1951, specifically on the tracks "She Moves Me" and "Still A Fool".

Chess contacted Sam Phillips (of Sun Records) to help find and record new artists from the South. Phillips supplied Chess with recordings by Howlin' Wolf, Rufus Thomas, and Doctor Ross among others. Of these, Howlin' Wolf in particular became very popular, and Chess Records had to vie for him with other companies which had also been supplied with Wolf recordings by Phillips. In time, other important artists signed with Chess Records, including Bo Diddley and Sonny Boy Williamson, while Willie Dixon and Robert Lockwood Jr. took on a significant role behind the scenes. In the 1950s, Chess Records' commercial success grew with artists such as Little Walter, The Moonglows, The Flamingos, and Chuck Berry, and in the '60s with Etta James, Fontella Bass, Koko Taylor, Little Milton, Laura Lee, and Tommy Tucker, as well as with the subsidiary labels Checker, Argo, and Cadet. As the 1960s progressed, Chess's recording enterprise branched out into other genres including gospel, traditional jazz, spoken word, comedy, and more. In the early 1960s, Chess became involved in the broadcasting business as part owner of WVON-AM radio and later acquired WSDM-FM, both in Chicago.

Personal life and legacy

In 1941, he married Revetta Sloan, who was also Jewish; they had three children: son Marshall and two daughters, Elaine and Susie.  On October 16, 1969, a few months after selling his namesake label to General Recorded Tape, Leonard Chess died of a heart attack. He was buried at Westlawn Cemetery in Norridge, Illinois.

Music industry historian John Broven has written that "Leonard Chess was the dynamo behind Chess Records, the label that, along with Atlantic and Sun, has come to epitomize the independent record business. ... Leonard Chess set new standards for the industry in artist development, deal making, networking, and marketing and promotion…" He was inducted into the Rock and Roll Hall of Fame in 1987, posthumously, in the non-performer category.

Film and TV adaptations 
Chess was the focus of 2008 movies Cadillac Records (portrayed by Adrien Brody) and Who Do You Love?  (portrayed by Alessandro Nivola) which are also fictional accounts of the ascent (and descent) of the label itself and the personnel who were involved or recorded at Chess Records.

He is portrayed by Rob Morrow on CMT's drama series titled Sun Records.

See also 
Marshall Chess – Leonard's son, eventually became President of Chess Records after the GRT acquisition in 1969.
Jamar Chess – Leonard's grandson, continues the family legacy, co-founder of music publishing companies Sunflower Entertainment and Revolution Songs.

References

Bibliography

External links

The Chess Label Part I (1950–1952) 
The Chess Label Part II (1953–1955) 
Chess Records
The Chess Story
Chess Records: How Two Polish Brothers Made Music History 

1917 births
1969 deaths
People from Motal
American music industry executives
American people of Polish-Jewish descent
Businesspeople from Chicago
Polish emigrants to the United States
20th-century American businesspeople
Chess family
Burials at Westlawn Cemetery